In topology, a branch of mathematics, Bing's recognition theorem, named for R. H. Bing, asserts that a necessary and sufficient condition for a 3-manifold M to be homeomorphic to the 3-sphere is that every Jordan curve in M be contained within a topological ball.

References
 

3-manifolds
Geometric topology
Theorems in topology